Henry Lane Mitchell, known as H. Lane Mitchell (August 17, 1895 – November 8, 1978), was a civil engineer who served from 1934 to 1968 as the elected citywide public works commissioner in his adopted city of Shreveport, Louisiana. Hailed during his tenure as a popular success, his life after retirement was marred by legal troubles which led to his imprisonment upon conviction of theft of multiple city properties under his domain.

References

1895 births
1978 deaths
People from Dublin, Texas
Valparaiso University alumni
20th-century American engineers
Politicians from Shreveport, Louisiana
Louisiana city council members
Louisiana Democrats
United States Army soldiers
American military personnel of World War I
20th-century American politicians
Catholics from Texas
Catholics from Louisiana